The Bishop–Irick Farmstead is a historic farmhouse at 17 Pemberton Road in the Vincentown section of Southampton Township of Burlington County, New Jersey. It was added to the National Register of Historic Places on August 4, 1992, for its significance in agriculture, architecture, and politics/government. It is now used as the headquarters of the Pinelands Preservation Alliance.

History
The oldest part of the house was built by John and Rebecca Bishop in 1753 for their  farm. The property was solely in the Bishop family until , when Emeline Bishop married John Stockton Irick, who then owned it. In 1932, the Bishop–Irick family sold the property and it became a smaller dairy farm. The land was subsequently subdivided, leaving the farmhouse on a  lot. It is now used by the Pinelands Preservation Alliance for offices, the Pinelands Visitors Center, and a nature trail.

Description
The farmhouse is a two and one-half story brick building with Georgian architecture. It features patterned brickwork using both Flemish Bond and English Bond. The barn, built in 1932, is a well-preserved example of a Louden barn in the area.

See also
 National Register of Historic Places listings in Burlington County, New Jersey
 List of the oldest buildings in New Jersey

References

External links
 

Southampton Township, New Jersey
National Register of Historic Places in Burlington County, New Jersey
Houses on the National Register of Historic Places in New Jersey
New Jersey Register of Historic Places
Houses in Burlington County, New Jersey
Houses completed in 1753
Brick buildings and structures